Carol Sklenicka is an American biographer, literary scholar, and essayist. She is best known as the author of Raymond Carver: A Writer's Life, a biography of short story writer Raymond Carver. In 2019, Sklenicka published Alice Adams: Portrait of a Writer, her biography of the short-story writer and novelist Alice Adams.

Life and education 
Sklenicka grew up in Santa Maria, California, graduating in 1971 from California Polytechnic State University in San Luis Obispo, California. In 1986, she received a Ph.D. in English and American literature from Washington University in St. Louis, where she studied with Naomi Lebowitz, Stanley Elkin, and Howard Nemerov. She taught literature and creative writing at Marquette University and at the Milwaukee Institute of Art & Design. She lives with poet and novelist R.M. Ryan (author of Vaudeville in the Dark, There's a Man with a Gun Over There, and The Lost Roads Adventure Club) near the Russian River in northern California.

Over the years, Sklenicka has contributed to multiple literary journals, including Confrontation, South Atlantic Quarterly, Iowa Woman, and Sou'wester. She is an active member of Biographers International Organization. In 2021, she was featured in conversation with biographers Tim Christian and Carl Rollyson on Rollyson’s podcast A Life in Biography, discussing the elements and mechanics involved in writing biographies.

Reception 
Upon publication, Sklenicka's biography of Carver was named one of the Ten Best Books of 2009 by The New York Times Book Review and a Notable Book by the San Francisco Chronicle, The Washington Post, and the Seattle Times. It followed more than a decade of interviews with Carver's friends, family, and writing colleagues,  though Carver's widow, poet Tess Gallagher, chose not to be interviewed by Sklenicka. Novelist Stephen King, writing in The New York Times Book Review, found that Sklenicka displayed "something like awe for Carver the writer" and was "almost nonjudgmental when it comes to Carver the nasty drunk and ungrateful (not to mention sometimes dangerous) husband", although Jason M. Appel, in Ploughshares, said "Carver, as presented by Sklenicka, is a man of profound moral shortcomings." Time found the book "judicious, thorough and sometimes harrowing".

In her most recent work, Sklenicka "gives us the first full-length popular biography of brilliant novelist and short story writer Alice Adams," noted a Christian Science Monitor reviewer, naming Alice Adams: Portrait of a Writer one of that newspaper's top 10 books for the month. According to The New York Times reviewer, Sklenicka was "prudent and appreciative in her assessment of Adams's work". The Minneapolis Star Tribune reviewer, calling Sklenicka’s biography “empathetic, revealing, and brisk,” wrote, “Sklenicka frames Adams’s life and work within themes of escape, redemption, and persistence… Adams’s footprint has faded. Sklenicka’s portrait may well encourage new readers and justifiably revive her reputation.”   The New Republics reviewer commented on the book's length: "It's hard to imagine any but the true devotee wading in: I think Adams was a superb writer, but I'm not sure I need 500 pages on her," but then wrote, "If you're the sort who delights in the account of the midcentury artistic life ... Portrait of a Writer does deliver."

Selected works 

 D. H. Lawrence and the Child. Columbia: University of Missouri Press, 1991.
 Raymond Carver: A Writer's Life. New York: Scribner, 2009.
 Alice Adams: A Writer's Life. New York: Scribner, 2019.

References

External links
Publishers Weekly review, Alice Adams: Portrait of a Writer
Economic Times Interview with Sklenicka
Carol Polsgrove on Writers' Lives: A Conversation on Raymond Carver
Ploughshares Review: Raymond Carver: A Writer's Life by Jason M. Appel
Washington Magazine: "Catching a Story-Catcher" by Candace O'Connor

Living people
People from Santa Maria, California
California Polytechnic State University alumni
Washington University in St. Louis alumni
Raymond Carver
1948 births
American biographers
People from San Luis Obispo, California
American women biographers